The Vijay Award for Best Actress is given by STAR Vijay as part of its annual Vijay Awards ceremony for Tamil (Kollywood) films. It was given from the second ceremony onwards.

Winners

Winners and nominations
 2007 Priyamani – Paruthiveeran
 Asin – Pokkiri
 Bhavana – Deepavali
 Jyothika – Mozhi
 Padmapriya – Mirugam
 2008 Sneha – Pirivom Santhippom
 Asin – Dasavathaaram
 Parvathy Thiruvothu – Poo
 Genelia D'Souza – Santosh Subramaniam

 2009 Pooja Umashanker – Naan Kadavul
 Padmapriya – Pokkisham
 Sindhu Menon – Eeram
 Tamannaah – Kandein Kadhalai
 Vega Tamotia – Pasanga
 2010 Anjali – Angadi Theru
 Amala Paul – Mynaa
 Reema Sen – Aayirathil Oruvan
 Aishwarya Rai – Ravanan
 Trisha – Vinnaithaandi Varuvaayaa
 2011 Anjali – Engaeyum Eppothum
 Nithya Menen – Nootrenbadhu
 Anushka Shetty – Deiva Thirumagal
 Iniya – Vaagai Sooda Vaa
 Richa Gangopadhyay – Mayakkam Enna

 2012 Samantha Ruth Prabhu – Neethane En Ponvasantham
Kajal Aggarwal - Thuppakki
Shruti Haasan  - 3
Sunaina - Neerparavai
Viji Chandrasekhar - Aarohanam
 2013 Nayanthara – Raja Rani
Parvathy Thiruvothu - Maryan
Pooja Umashanker  - Vidiyum Munn
Sneha - Haridas
Vedhicka - Paradesi
 2014 Amala Paul – Velaiyilla Pattathari
Nithya Menen - Malini 22 Palayamkottai
Lakshmi Menon - Naan Sigappu Manithan
Sridivya - Jeeva
Vedhicka - Kaaviya Thalaivan

See also
 Tamil cinema
 Cinema of India

References

Actress
Film awards for lead actress